Blacksod Lighthouse (Gaelic: Fód Dubh) is a lighthouse at the southern end of the Mullet Peninsula, Erris, County Mayo, at the entrance to Blacksod Bay. It is made of local granite blocks, which are believed to have come from Termon Hill, a nearby isolated outcrop of high quality granite. The keeper's house is a two-storey square building, which has always been unpainted.  It is occupied by a resident lighthousekeeper who is also responsible for Blackrock Lighthouse.  Blacksod is of unusual design for a lighthouse, being a square block of a building with only a small conical lantern section on top of it which is painted white.

History
Blacksod Lighthouse was built in 1864 by one of the leading merchants in Belmullet at that time, Bryan Carey.

Weather observations in June 1944 by the Blacksod lighthousekeepers caused the Normandy landings to be postponed.  While remaining neutral during World War II, Ireland continued to supply weather reports to Britain under an agreement in place since independence. D-Day had been scheduled to commence on 5 June 1944, but a report from Ted Sweeney of the Sweeney family (Blacksod's lighthousekeepers) of approaching bad weather fronts caused Eisenhower to delay the invasion until 6 June 1944, when conditions were more favourable.

The house at Blacksod was badly damaged in 1989 by a rogue wave. It was repaired and used by the Commissioners of Irish Lights and the Irish Coast Guard as a refueling station for helicopters. The lighthouse, which used to be family home, was later opened as a visitor centre and offers some guided tours.

Associated lighthouses

The keeper for Blacksod Lighthouse is also responsible for Blackrock Lighthouse at Blackrock Island. Located 12 miles west of Blacksod Bay, the lighthouse on Blackrock is automated and accessible only by helicopter. On 14 March 2017, four Irish Coast Guard personnel were killed in a crash off Blackrock Lighthouse when it was understood they were seeking to refuel at Blacksod lighthouse.

See also

 List of lighthouses in Ireland

References

External links
Commissioners of Irish Lights
Blacksod Lighthouse and Eagle Island lighthouse photos
 Blacksod, Blackrock and other lighthouse pictures

Lighthouses completed in 1864
Lighthouses in the Republic of Ireland
Lighthouses on the National Inventory of Architectural Heritage